Alberto Borghetti (born 29 May 1967 in Cesena) is an Italian electrical engineer and a professor in the Department of Electrical, Electronic, and Information Engineering "Guglielmo Marconi" of the University of Bologna, Italy. He was named Fellow of the Institute of Electrical and Electronics Engineers (IEEE) in 2015 for contributions to modeling of power distribution systems under transient conditions.

References

External links

1967 births
Living people
Italian electrical engineers
University of Bologna alumni
Academic staff of the University of Bologna
20th-century Italian engineers
21st-century Italian engineers
Fellow Members of the IEEE
Electrical engineering academics
People from Cesena